Dry Fork power station  is a coal-fired power station near Gillette in the U.S. state of Wyoming.  it is claimed to be the only US coal-fired power station which is cost competitive with renewable power.

References

Coal-fired power stations in Wyoming